Gordon Cruickshank (May 4, 1965 – August 9, 2021) was a Canadian retired ice hockey forward who was an All-American for Providence.

Career
Cruickshank arrived in Providence in 1984 and had a pedestrian first season with the ice hockey team. Despite underperforming, he was selected by the Boston Bruins in the NHL Draft. Cruickshank seemed to prove the Bruins' scouts correct when he nearly tripled his point production and took over as the top offensive threat for the Friars. He was 23 goals better than the next highest teammate and was named to the second All-Conference team despite Providence finishing 10 games below .500. This trend continued through Cruickshank's final two seasons with the Friars and, though he was not able to help the team achieve much success, he was an All-American in his final college season. Cruickshank joined the Maine Mariners for the tail end of the 1988 season and prepared to continue his professional career the following season.

Just before the Bruins' training camp, Cruickshank injured his left ankle. He ended up needing surgery to fix a bone chip and was sidelined for several months. When he tried to return in February, Cruickshank was out of shape and his ankle still had not completely healed. Cruickshank lost the entire season to the injury but did return for Boston's training camp in 1989. He demonstrated the scoring touch he had in Providence and was assigned to Maine at the start of the season but he found it difficult to get into the lineup. Cruickshank played just 24 games for the Mariners before being sent down to the ECHL to finish out the year. The next season, Cruickshank was one of the top goal-scorers for the Johnstown Chiefs, finishing 8th in the league with 44 markers. Despite the performance, Cruickshank was not called up and spent his third year as a professional bouncing between three teams before hanging up his skates.

Statistics

Regular season and playoffs

Awards and honors

References

External links

1965 births
2021 deaths
Ice hockey people from Ontario
Sportspeople from Mississauga
Canadian ice hockey right wingers
Providence Friars men's ice hockey players
AHCA Division I men's ice hockey All-Americans
Maine Mariners players
Johnstown Chiefs players
Nashville Knights players
Raleigh IceCaps players
Greensboro Monarchs players
Boston Bruins draft picks